Joachim Ignatius Sebastian Alva or Joachim Piedade Alva (21 January 1907 – 28 June 1979) was an Indian lawyer, journalist and politician from Mangalore. He was a prominent Mangalorean Christian figure involved in the Indian independence movement.

After Independence, Alva was appointed Sheriff of Bombay in 1949 for the Bombay state. In 1950, he entered the Provisional Parliament of India. He was elected to the Lok Sabha in 1952, 1957, and 1962 from North Kanara. He was nominated to the Rajya Sabha in 1968 and retired from the Rajya Sabha in 1974.

History

Joachim Alva belonged to the Alva-Bhat, a Mangalorean Catholic clan from Belle in Udupi district. He was educated at the Jesuit St. Aloysius College, Mangalore, Elphinstone College, Government Law College, Mumbai and the Jesuit St. Xavier's College, Mumbai.

In 1928, Alva became the first Christian to be appointed as Secretary of the fifty-year-old Bombay Students Brotherhood. Along with Khurshed Nariman, H.D. Raja and Soli Batliwala, he was a pioneer of the Bombay Youth League.

In 1930, Alva founded the Nationalist Christian Party with the goal of drawing the Christian community into the freedom struggle. He was expelled from St. Xavier's College for moving a resolution at the Catholic Students Union urging it to throw open its doors to students of other communities. In 1937, Alva presided over a large meeting of Christians at Bombay addressed by Jawaharlal Nehru. He was actively involved in organizing the "No-Tax" campaign at the Bardoli Satyagraha and appointed Dictator of the War Council.

Imprisoned twice by British Indian authorities on charges of sedition, Alva was jail companion to Vallabhbhai Patel, Jayaprakash Narayan, Morarji Desai and J. C. Kumarappa. In 1934, Mahatma Gandhi wrote a letter to Alva to inform him that he had missed him at Yerwada Jail because of his early release.

In Nasik prison, Alva wrote two books: Men and Supermen of Hindustan and Indian Christians and Nationalism. Although the manuscripts of both were confiscated by prison authorities, Men and Supermen of Hindustan was subsequently re-drafted and published in 1943.

In 1937, Alva married Violet Hari, a Gujarati Protestant from Ahmedabad and professor of English at St. Xavier's Indian Women's University College. Violet would also go on to become active in national politics.

On 9 August 1943, the first anniversary of Quit India Day, Joachim and Violet Alva founded FORUM, a weekly news magazine which became known for its championing of the cause of independence.

After Independence, Alva was appointed Sheriff of Bombay in 1949. In 1950, he entered the Provisional Parliament of India. He was  elected to the Lok Sabha in 1952 and 1957 and 1962 from North Kanara. In 1952, Violet was elected to the Rajya Sabha making them the first couple to be elected to Parliament under adult franchise.

The Government of India issued a stamp commemorating the couple in November 2008.

Personal life

Joachim and Violet Alva had two sons, Niranjan and Chittaranjan, and a daughter, Maya.

The couple were close associates of Khin Kyi, Burma's ambassador to India from 1960, widow of Burmese nationalist General Aung San. The late Henry F. Grady, the first US Ambassador to India, was godfather to Maya.

His son Niranjan is married to Margaret Alva, née Margaret Nazareth, former General Secretary of the All India Congress Committee, former Governor of Uttarakhand and Rajasthan.

References

1907 births
1979 deaths
India MPs 1952–1957
India MPs 1957–1962
India MPs 1962–1967
Indian independence activists from Karnataka
Indian Roman Catholics
Lok Sabha members from Karnataka
Mangaloreans
Nominated members of the Rajya Sabha
Rajya Sabha members from Karnataka
Sheriffs of Mumbai
Prisoners and detainees of British India